AwesomenessTV is an American sketch-comedy reality series based on the YouTube channel of the same name and is created by Brian Robbins. Both seasons contain 20 episodes.

On May 1, 2014, Nickelodeon announced that the series had been renewed for a second season which premiered on May 5, 2014. It was not renewed for a third season due to the end of DreamWorks Animation's television deal with Nickelodeon through Viacom, who later bought AwesomenessTV in 2018.

Plot
In the first season, the series was hosted by Daniella Monet as she presented sketches, music videos, and hidden camera antics. Young celebrities guest co-hosted episodes in the second season.

Recurring sketches
 As the Locker Turns – A soap opera parody detailing various occurrences at a school.
 Bad Lifeguard on Duty – Cody (portrayed by Teala Dunn) and Harper (played by Lauren Elizabeth) are two lifeguards who don't take their job seriously.
 Bad Troop Leader – A troop leader (portrayed by Taryn Southern) does a terrible job when leading her scout troop.
 Best Excuses – Teala Dunn portrays different girls who show viewers different excuses for everything.
 Cave Girl's Guide To Beauty – A prehistoric teenage cavewoman (portrayed by Lainey Lipson) hosts a vlog where she shows people her prehistoric beauty tips as the self-proclaimed "prehistoric beauty guru."
 Gillian's Island – Gillian (portrayed by Amber Montana) is a girl who is a castaway on an island after her little brother farted and she fell off her parents' boat. With the help of her coconut friend Becky, who is also the producer of her show, Gillian shows people different things to do on the island while awaiting to be rescued.
 Gnarly Mann – Gnarly Mann (portrayed by Noland Ammon) is a radical and bodacious surfer-speaking boy who helps people with their romance problems.
 Hi-Tech History – Professor Hopkins Bittridge (portrayed by Kian Lawley) narrates about historic events while mentioning what would happen if there was advanced technology in the past.
 JennXPenn's 10 Ten – JennXPenn (the user name of Jenn McAllister) gives the views the top 10 guide for various topics.
 Kid History – A young narrator (portrayed by Zac Pullman) tells people about historic events in kid history like the first pillow fight and the first homework excuse.
 MadMoni - Different videos involving Madeline Whitby and Monica Sherer doing things like music video parodies.
 Mega Taco – Timbo (portrayed by Kamil McFadden) and Lala (played by Lia Marie Johnson) work at the Mega Taco food truck and try to make the orders there "mega."
 Molly is Totally Judging You – Molly Sanders (portrayed by Teala Dunn) is a teenage judge who presides over the campus dramas at Franklin High School where she is assisted by her teenage bailiff Bailey (portrayed by Lainey Lipson). Molly would go over different teenage cases where a teenager would sue another teenager for bad things that they did to them.
 Pet Therapist – A pet therapist (portrayed by Lia Marie Johnson) goes over therapy sessions with a pet and their owner where the therapist would often speak the mind of the owner's pet.
 Sarah's Slumber Party – Sarah (portrayed by Lauren Elizabeth) hosts a slumber party with her best friend Elizabeth (portrayed by Meghan Rienks). Their third member is Chloe (portrayed by Arden Rose) who Sarah reluctantly invites due to her mom being friends with Chloe's mom.
 Sierra's Guide to Acting Glamorously – Sierra (portrayed by Paulina Cerrilla) shows people how to act glamorously with the help of her butler Edmund (portrayed by Corey Johnson).
 Signs You're Addicted to... – Teala Dunn plays a different character who is addicted to a variety of social network services like Instagram, Twitter, Facebook, and others.
 Super Fan Brit Stickley – Brit Stickley (portrayed by Tiffany Espensen) is a super fan who would infiltrate different places where different celebrities are at and collects different things from them to put in her scrapbook. She is often accompanied by her offscreen little brother Petey as her cameraman where Brit would often argue with him.
 Super Science with Melvin – A self-proclaimed super scientist named Melvin (portrayed by Noland Ammon) tries to make new inventions which backfires on him.
 Swag Master J – Swag Master J (portrayed by Kamil McFadden) is a nerd who can "swaggify" anything.
 Terry the Tomboy – A tomboy named Terry (portrayed by Lia Marie Johnson) teaches the viewers of her vlog her guide to various stuff. She sometimes drags her friend Duncanty (portrayed by Noland Ammon) into her different vlogs. This sketch has a TV film of the same name.
 The Breakup Queen – A girl (portrayed by Sydney Park) breaks up with various people.
 The Love Doctor – Lindsay (portrayed by Lia Marie Johnson) runs an online show under the alias of "The Love Doctor" where she gives love advice to people who write to her.
 The Totally Completely Absolutely Unhelpful Verbose Customer Service Girl – Mia Anders (portrayed by Audrey Whitby) is a talkative customer service Girl who won't stop derailing the conversation whenever someone calls her up for customer service
 The Worst DIY'er – Cybil (portrayed by Audrey Whitby) teaches people how to handle do-it-yourself projects which doesn't go well for her.
 Us and Jan – A series of music videos where Audrey (portrayed by Audrey Whitby) would do some activity and would be annoyed by her friend Jan (played by Allisyn Ashley Arm) who would try to get involved in the activity with disastrous results.
 Violet's Vampire Vlog – A vampire named Violet (portrayed by Catherine Valdes) does a vlog that details what vampires should be like when encountering people at night.
 World's Worst Babysitter – A laid back babysitter named Lia (portrayed by Lia Marie Johnson) shows viewers what not to do when babysitting as she demonstrates on her client Sammie (portrayed by her younger sister Sammie Johnson).
 Worst Teacher Ever – A teacher (portrayed by Brittani Louise Taylor) tells inaccurate information to her class.
 Yo My Boyfriend Ugly – Angelica Fratelli (portrayed by Teala Dunn) does makeovers to various characters to make them look good.
 Zay Zay and Jojo Sketches – Various sketches depict Zay Zay and Jo Jo in different activities.
 Like a Boss – Zay Zay and Jo Jo show viewers how to do different things like a boss.
 Random Thoughts by Jo Jo – Jo Jo tells people his random thoughts.
 The Most Interesting Kid in the World – A parody of The Most Interesting Man in the World where Zay Zay has interesting talents like teaching his teachers, ghosts believing in him, making bullies pee their pants, and not being found during a game of hide and seek.
 Would You Rather – Zay Zay and Jo Jo ask each other "Would You Rather" questions.

Cast

 Daniella Monet as Host (season 1 and part of 2)
 Noland Ammon as Various
 Allisyn Ashley Arm as Various
 Joey Bragg as Various
 Paulina Cerrilla as Various
 Ricky Dillon as Various
 Teala Dunn as Various
 Gracie Dzienny as Various
 Lauren Elizabeth as Various
 Luke Eilers as Various
 Tiffany Espensen as Various
 Sophie Everhart as Various
 Connor Franta as Various
 Isaiah "Zay Zay" Fredericks as himself
 Jo Jo Fredericks as himself
 John Gasienica as Various
 Damien Haas as Various
 Corey Johnson as Various
 Lia Marie Johnson as Various
 Sammie Johnson as Various
 Kian Lawley as Various
 Fred Ligaard as Various
 Lainey Lipson as Various
 Austin Mahone as Various
 Jenn McAllister as Various
 Kamil McFadden as Various
 Amber Montana as Various
 Trevi Moran as Various
 Sydney Park as Various
 Zac Pullman as Various
 Meghan Rienks as Various
 Arden Rose as Various
 Monica Sherer - Various
 Bridget Shergalis as Various
 Taryn Southern as Various
 Brittani Louise Taylor as Various
 Shayne Topp as Various
 Catherine Valdes as Various
 Audrey Whitby as Various
 Madeline Whitby - Various
 Jenna Willis as Various

Production
The show is based on the YouTube channel and multi-channel network of the same name, featuring original content and existing content already on the channel. On August 27, 2013, Nickelodeon picked up 7 more episodes to add to Season 1, bringing the freshman season up to 20 episodes.

Episodes

Series overview

Season 1 (2013)
Daniella Monet hosts this entire season.

Season 2 (2014–2015)

References

External links
 AwesomenessTV at Internet Movie Database

2010s American reality television series
2010s American satirical television series
2010s American sketch comedy television series
2013 American television series debuts
2015 American television series endings
2010s Nickelodeon original programming
English-language television shows
American children's reality television series
Awesomeness (company)
Television series by DreamWorks Animation